The Leithsville Formation is a geologic formation in New Jersey. It preserves fossils dating back to the Cambrian period.

See also

 List of fossiliferous stratigraphic units in New Jersey
 Paleontology in New Jersey

References
 

Cambrian geology of New Jersey
Cambrian southern paleotemperate deposits